Jagmohan Yadav is a retired 1983 batch IPS officer belonging to Uttar Pradesh Cadre who has served as the Director General of Uttar Pradesh Police.

Education
Yadav has a postgraduate degree in philosophy (MA:Philosophy) from Allahabad University.

Career
Apart from serving as the Director General (DG) of Uttar Pradesh Police, Yadav served in key positions in Uttar Pradesh Government (Police) including as Additional Director General (Law and Order),  Inspector General (IG) of Meerut, Bareilly and Gorakhpur Zones, Inspector General of Uttar Pradesh Special Task Force (UP STF), Deputy Inspector General (DIG) of Lucknow, Barielly Gorakhpur Ranges. He also served as the Director General of CB-CID (Crime Branch-Criminal Investigation Department).

He was also the District Senior Superintendent of Police/Superintendent of Police (SSP/SP) of Kanpur, Agra, Saharanpur, Dehradun, Sitapur, Deoaria and Maharajganj districts.

Yadav retired on 31 December 2015.

Decorations 

  Police Medal for meritorious service - Received on 26 January 2000
  President's Police Medal for distinguished service - Received on 26 January 2011
  50th Independence Anniversary Medal - Received on 15 August 1997

See also
Uttar Pradesh Police

References 

Director Generals of Uttar Pradesh Police
Indian Police Service officers
University of Allahabad alumni
1955 births
Living people